Mavingouni is a village on the island of Grande Comore (Ngazidja) in the Comoros. According to the 1991 census, the village had a population of 1046. Mavingouni is located 2.7 kilometers from the country's capital, Moroni.

References

Populated places in Grande Comore